Conus laueri is a species of sea snail, a marine gastropod mollusk in the family Conidae, the cone snails, cone shells or cones.

These snails are predatory and venomous. They are capable of "stinging" humans.

Description
The size of the shell varies between 38 mm and 74 mm.

Distribution
This marine species occurs in the Persian Gulf.

References

 E. Monnier & L. Limpalaër (2013): Darioconus laueri (Gastropoda: Conidae) New Species from the Eastern Persian Gulf - Visaya Vol. 4 n°1
 Loïc Limpalaër & Eric Monnier, New informations and specimens of Darioconus laueri Monnier & Limpalaër, 2013; Xenophora Taxonomy N° 2 - Supplément au Xenophora n° 145 - Janvier 2014
 Puillandre N., Duda T.F., Meyer C., Olivera B.M. & Bouchet P. (2015). One, four or 100 genera? A new classification of the cone snails. Journal of Molluscan Studies. 81: 1-23

External links
 World Register of Marine Species
 

laueri
Gastropods described in 2013